The 2022 U.K. Open Pool Championship is the ongoing inaugural international nine-ball pool tournament held from 17 to 22 May 2022 at the Copper Box Arena, London.

Tournament format
Similar to the 2021 U.S. Open Pool Championship and the 2022 European Open Pool Championship, the tournament uses a double-elimination bracket with matches held as a race to 9 racks, until the last 16. Then, it would become single-elimination tournament race to 11 racks. The final is race to 13 racks

Prize fund
The total prize fund is $200,000 with the winner receiving $30,000.

References

Pool competitions